Burleigh Connection Road (state route 80) is a major arterial road connecting the Pacific Motorway with the Gold Coast suburb of Burleigh Heads.

It is a state-controlled district road (number 102).

Route Description 
Burleigh Connection Road is a 3.7 kilometer, 4 lane road that connects Burleigh Heads with the Pacific Motorway on the western end of Varsity Lakes. The road commences at the Intersection of Scottsdale Road and the exit and entry ramps of the Pacific Motorway in Varsity Lakes and travels east through Burleigh Waters and provides a connection to Southport - Burleigh Road before terminating at West Burleigh Road opposite Stocklands Burleigh Heads Shopping Centre.  State Route 80 does continue on as West Burleigh Road for another 1.6 kilometers before finally terminating at the Gold Coast Highway in central Burleigh Heads.

Major Intersections 
Below is a list of major intersections for Burleigh Connection Road. 
The road is in the Gold Coast local government area.

References

See also 

 List of numbered roads in Queensland

Roads in Queensland